Lautaro Chávez (born 17 January 2001) is an Argentine professional footballer who plays as a winger or an attacking midfielder for Gimnasia La Plata.

Club career
Chávez started his senior career in La Plata with Gimnasia y Esgrima, who he signed for in 2015. He made his first appearance for the Primera División club on 9 March 2018 against Banfield, he was substituted on for the final seven minutes having been an unused substitutes for previous fixtures with Estudiantes and San Lorenzo. Another appearance followed versus San Martín as Gimnasia y Esgrima placed twenty-third in 2017–18 under Darío Ortiz.

International career
Chávez received an Argentina U18 call-up in July 2019 for the L'Alcúdia International Tournament in Spain.

Career statistics
.

References

External links

2001 births
Living people
Argentine footballers
Sportspeople from Corrientes Province
Association football wingers
Association football midfielders
Club de Gimnasia y Esgrima La Plata footballers
Argentine Primera División players